Fifteen ships of the French Navy have borne the name Seine in honour of the Seine river:

Ships named Seine 
 , or Seyne, a 6-gun ship captured from the Dutch.
 , a 4-gun fluyt
 , a 44-gun fluyt, captured by the British on 26 July 1704 and commissioned in the Royal Navy as HMS Falkland Prize
 , a 
  (1768),  a 
 , a 
 , a 40-gun frigate, lead ship of her class. Captured by three British frigates during the action of 30 June 1798 and recommissioned in the Royal Navy as HMS Seine.
 , a gunboat commissioned on the Nile
  (1800), a fluyt. She was renamed to Seine at the Bourbon Restoration, and bore the name Escaut again during the Hundred Days before being renamed back to Seine. 
 ,  a 20-gun  flûte that her crew scuttled to avoid her capture in 1809 by the British Royal Navy
 , a 26-gun flute
 , a 
  (1891), originally a torpedo-boat-tending cruiser and later to become the first seaplane tender in history, was started as Seine before being renamed. 
 , a littoral transport ship
  (1962), a replenishment oiler

Ships with related names 
  (1917), an auxiliary ship, formerly the German Lynton
  (1917), an auxiliary ship

See also

Notes and references

Notes

References

Bibliography 
 
 
Winfield, Rif & Stephen S Roberts (2015) French Warships in the Age of Sail 1786 - 1861: Design Construction, Careers and Fates. (Seaforth Publishing). 

French Navy ship names